Eger may refer to:

Places
Eger, a city in Hungary
Eger (Tisza), tributary of the river Tisza
Eger wine region
Roman Catholic Archdiocese of Eger
Eger (Balaton), river flowing to Lake Balaton, Hungary
Eger, German name of Cheb, Czech Republic 
Eger Graben, region around Cheb/Eger
Egerland, another region around Cheb/Eger
Eger, German name of the Ohře river
Eger (Wörnitz), river in Baden-Württemberg and in Bavaria, Germany
3103 Eger, asteroid Eger, named after the Hungarian city

People
Adolf Eger (1878–1958), Norwegian barrister
Akiva Eger (1761–1837), rabbi
Anton Eger (born 1980), Norwegian/Swedish Jazz drummer
Conrad Wilhelm Eger (1880–1966), Norwegian businessman
David Eger (born 1952), American professional golfer
Denise Eger (born 1960), American reform rabbi
Elizabeth Eger (born 1971), reader in the Department of English at King's College London
Günther Eger (born 1964), German bobsledder
Kent Eger (born 1981), Canadian golfer
László Éger (born 1977), Hungarian football centre back
Marcel Eger (born 1983), German former footballer
Susanna Eger (1640–1713), German cook and cookbook writer
Eger V. Murphree (1898–1962), American chemist

Other uses
EGER is the ICAO code of Stronsay Airport

See also

 
Egri FC, Eger, Hungary
Eger-Eszterházy SzSE, handball club in Hungary
 Jack Egers (born 1949) Canadian ice hockey player
 Eiger (disambiguation)
 Eager (disambiguation)
 Egar (disambiguation)